Uttam may refer to:

Military
 Uttam AESA Radar an aircraft Fire-control radar designed by Electronics and Radar Development Establishment of Defence Research and Development Organisation, Ministry of Defence, India

People
Uttam is an Indian given name.

People with this name include:

 Uttam Bandu Tupe
 Uttam Gada
 Uttam Ghoshal
 Uttam Kamble
 Uttam Khobragade
 Uttam Kumar
 Uttam Kumar (artist)
Uttam Kunwar
 Uttam Leishangthem Singh
 Uttam Mohanty
 Uttam Nakate
 Uttam Neupane
 Uttam Rai
 Uttam Sarkar
 Uttam Singh
 Uttama Chola
 Uttambhai Nathalal Mehta
 Uttambhai Patel
 Uttamchand Khimchand Sheth
 Uttamrao Dhikale
 Uttamrao Patil
 Uttamsingh Pawar

Uttam can also refer to a village in Gujrat District, Punjab (Pakistan)